Mykola Bychok  (born 13 February 1980) is a Ukrainian Greek Catholic hierarch as the bishop of the Ukrainian Catholic Eparchy of Saints Peter and Paul of Melbourne since June 2020.

Life
Bychok was born in Ternopil in 1980. He joined the Congregation of the Most Holy Redeemer, popularly known as the Redemptorists, in July 1997. His religious training took place in Ukraine and Poland, where he obtained a licentiate in pastoral theology. On 17 August 2003, Bychok took his religious vows, and on 3 May 2005 he was ordained a priest in the Ukrainian Catholic Archeparchy of Lviv.

Following his ordination, Bychok spent time as a missionary at the Mother Church of Perpetual Help in Prokopyevsk, Russia. He latter served as the superior of Saint Joseph's Redemptorists Monastery and pastor of the Mother Parish of Perpetual Help in Ivano-Frankivsk, Ukraine. From 2015 to 2020 Bychok served as the vicar of the Ukrainian Catholic parish of Saint John the Baptist in Newark, NJ, part of the Archieparchy of Philadelphia of the Ukrainians.

On 15 January 2020, he was appointed by Pope Francis as the eparchial bishop of the Ukrainian Catholic Eparchy of Saints Peter and Paul of Melbourne, succeeding Peter Stasiuk.

On 7 June 2020 (the feast of Pentecost in the Julian Calendar), he was consecrated as bishop by Major Archbishop Sviatoslav Shevchuk and other hierarchs of the Ukrainian Greek Catholic Church in St. George's Cathedral, Lviv.

References

External links

1980 births
Living people
People from Ternopil
Redemptorist bishops
Ukrainian Eastern Catholics
Bishops of the Ukrainian Greek Catholic Church
Eastern Catholic bishops in Oceania